Lake Ohakuri, at , is the largest artificial lake of the Waikato river system in New Zealand. It forms the reservoir for the Ōhakuri hydroelectric power station. Construction of the dam, approved in 1955, began in 1956 and was completed in 1960. The lake was filled over 14 days in January and February 1961. This drowned two thirds of the Orakei Korako geothermal area, including two of the world's largest geysers, Minginui Geyser and Orakei Korako Geyser.

See also
 Ohakuri Dam
 List of dams and reservoirs in New Zealand

References

Infrastructure completed in 1961
Reservoirs in New Zealand
Waikato River
Lakes of Waikato